Green Acres is a census-designated place in Rolette County, North Dakota, United States. Its population was 605 as of the 2020 census.

Demographics

Education
The local school district is the Belcourt School District (Turtle Mountain Community School).

References

Census-designated places in Rolette County, North Dakota
Census-designated places in North Dakota